St  Stephen's Church is a parish church in Astley, Greater Manchester, England. It is an active Anglican church built in 1968 and part of Leigh deanery in the archdeaconry of Salford and diocese of Manchester. The church, together with St George's Church, Tyldesley and St John's Church, Mosley Common is part of the united benefice of Astley, Tyldesley and Mosley Common. Its origins are in Astley Chapel, a chapel of ease of Leigh Parish Church built in 1631 and its successor which was burned in an arson attack in 1961.

History
The first chapel, built and paid for by Adam Mort the wealthy owner of Damhouse who died in early 1631, was consecrated on 3 August in the same year by the Bishop of Chester. It was the first chapel of ease of the mother church of Leigh, and dedicated to St Stephen, the first Christian martyr. The chapel was built of local brick on part of the common. The Reverend Thomas Crompton, appointed by Thomas Mort, was the first minister in 1632.

The chapel stood for nearly 130 years until it was rebuilt after becoming dilapidated. The second, slightly larger chapel was built on the same site in 1760. Thomas Froggatt of Damhouse gave a contribution towards the cost of reconstruction. It could hold 170 people and had a nave with four side and two end windows, and a small chancel and had an embattled western tower containing a single bell. The chapel was enlarged in 1834, 1842, and 1847.

The second chapel was destroyed by fire on 18 June 1961 and it was decided not to rebuild it but relocate to a site on Manchester Road. The third St Stephen's Church was consecrated on 26 October 1968.

Clergy
The first minister was the son of William Crompton of Bedford and his successor was from Shakerley. They were both educated at Brasenose College, Oxford.

1632 Thomas Crompton, B.A. (ejected for nonconformity).
1683 John Battersby  
1702 Roger Seddon, died 1716 
1716 James Marsh, died 1728 
1732 Thomas Mawdesley, died 1769 
1769 Robert Barker 
1822 Thomas Birkett 
1838 John Wilkinson Edwards, B.A. died 1840 
1840 Alfred Hewlett, D.D. died 1885 
1885 James Alexander Maxwell Johnstone, M.A
1970s Jack Finney
1980s John Findon
2010 Jonathan Carmyllie (Team rector of the united benefice of Astley, Tyldesley and Mosley Common)

See also
List of churches in Greater Manchester

References
Notes

Bibliography

Astley
Astley